Onymapata is a monotypic moth genus in the subfamily Arctiinae. Its single species, Onymapata vittata, is found in the Philippines. Gustaaf Hulstaert erected the genus in 1924 and described the species in 1923.

References

Lithosiini